Walter Wang is a Taiwanese philanthropist, businessperson, and CEO. He is the co-founder of The Walter and Shirley Wang Foundation, and JMM Foundation, a philanthropic organization. He is also the CEO of JM Eagle, a global manufacturer of plastic pipe. Wang's father was Wang Yung-ching, founder of the plastics and petrochemicals conglomerate Formosa Plastics Group and one of the wealthiest individuals in Taiwan before his death in 2008. His sister is Cher Wang, co-founder and chairperson (since 2007) of HTC Corporation and integrated chipset maker VIA Technologies.

Early life and education 

Wang's father was Taiwanese billionaire, Wang Yung-ching, who is known informally as Y.C. Wang. Y.C. Wang died on October 15, 2008, at age 91. Wang is the youngest of Y.C. Wang's five children by Wang Yang Chiao. When Wang was nine years old, Wang Yang Chiao left Taiwan against Y.C. Wang's wishes, forgoing fame and fortune, despite having helped to build the Formosa Plastics conglomerate, in order to bring Wang to California to shield them from the family strife in Taiwan. They moved to Berkeley, California to be closer to one of Yang Chiao's older children, Cher Wang.

Wang attended University of California - Berkeley before moving back to Taiwan to work for his father's corporation, Formosa Plastics Group, in 1988. He met his wife, Shirley Wang, in 1990. Three months later, Y.C. Wang summoned Walter Wang to move to New Jersey, to help turn around the struggling JM Manufacturing.

Career

In 2005, Wang purchased JM Manufacturing through syndicated loans from his father. In 2007, Wang bought PW Eagle, another large PVC pipe producer, to form JM Eagle. JM Eagle continues to exceed $1 billion in sales. JM Eagle relocated its headquarters to Los Angeles, California in 2008. The company has over 1,300 employees in 21 plants throughout the U.S., Mexico, and China.

Wang is a board member of the publicly listed Formosa Petrochemical and Formosa Chemical and Fiber Corporations in Taiwan. He is also a member of the Young Presidents Organization Los Angeles and Intercontinental chapters. He belongs to the World Economic Forum and the Committee of 100 (C-100). Wang sits on the Board of Directors for the Danny Thompson Memorial Leukemia Foundation, the Los Angeles Police Foundation, the Aaron Diamond AIDS Research Center, the DEA Educational Foundation, the Chinese Overseas Exchange Association, and the Boao Forum in China. Along with his wife, Wang is a trustee of the U.S. Olympic Committee, and both serve on the board of the Los Angeles Olympic Committee 2028.

Philanthropy 

Wang is a benefactor to causes in the United States and internationally, ranging from education to healthcare, social and immigration issues, anti-drug campaigns, and efforts to raise cultural awareness. He is co-founder of the Walter and Shirley Wang Foundation and the JMM Foundation, along with his wife.

JM Eagle participates in various philanthropic efforts, namely those where polyvinyl chloride (PVC) piping can help facilitate the acquisition of natural resources in underprivileged communities. In 2009, The Earth Institute of Columbia University's "Millennium Project" partnered with the United Nations and JM Eagle to establish innovative water systems in several Sub-Saharan countries, including Rwanda, Kenya, and Uganda. This project provided water to 13,500 people with 70 miles of pipe to 52 villages. JM Eagle donated over 300 miles of pipe that bring water to over 300,000 people in Africa as well as plastic pipe and other materials to transport drinking water from a mountain spring to a community of 5,000 people in Honduras.

JM Eagle has also provided scholarships for young African girls to assist in education through college and aided in water delivery and sanitation systems in Northern Thailand. JM Eagle supports China's initiative to provide its entire population with clean water. JM provides piping to low income housing through Habitat for Humanity, as well as helped to build the New York Outward Bound inner city youth center.

Together, the Wangs established an endowed chair at the Cedar Sinai Medical Center for Pediatric Surgery, both to fund novel research in pediatric surgery and to assist underprivileged children in need of surgery. In 2012, the Walter and Shirley Wang Foundation provided emergency relief blankets for Syrian refugees in Jordan. The Walter and Shirley Wang Foundation helped establish the DEA Museum in Los Angeles, California, with the goal of educating the public on illegal drugs and trafficking. They also support Doctors Without Borders.

Walter and Shirley Wang established an endowment at University of California - Los Angeles (UCLA), Shirley Wang's alma mater, to support students from middle-income families and have given scholarships in chemistry and biochemistry to students, graduate students, middle-income students, fellowships, and study abroad programs. The Wangs have also endowed a chair for Asian American Studies and a chair for Medicinal Discovery at UCLA. The couple also funded Wang Hall at Harvard Westlake School in Los Angeles, California, and provided the lead donation for the renovation of the Harvard Westlake Humanities and Art Building. At UCLA, they endowed the first academic chair on U.S.-China relations and Chinese American studies in the United States.

In the interest of Chinese-U.S. relations, the Wangs funded six staff positions at Asian Americans Advancing Justice, Los Angeles to help provide legal services to immigrant survivors of domestic violence. Likewise, the Wangs funded three documentaries on Chinese-American history and pressing social issues in China, where they also strongly support AIDS-prevention campaigns. The documentary The Blood of Yingzhou District, which focuses on the AIDS epidemic in China, won the 2007 Academy Award for Best Documentary (Short Subject). A second film, The Warriors of Qiugang, which was nominated for an Academy Award for Best Documentary (Short Subject) in 2010, propelled the Chinese government to invest the American equivalent of $30 million to clean up the toxic waste around the waterway where the film takes place. The Wangs are the most prominent sponsors of the Emmy-nominated PBS documentary Becoming American: The Chinese Experience by [Bill Moyers]. The three-part, six-hour documentary examines immigration, citizenship, and the Chinese-American experience.

In the wake of the COVID-19 global pandemic, JM Eagle and Plastpro, Inc. also donated surgical masks to Ohio facilities local to the Plastpro, Inc. factory. Walter and Shirley Wang donated $1 million to the Mayor's Fund of Los Angeles, in addition to supplies for face shields intended for use at Cedars Sinai Medical Center and the Innovation Lab at UCLA.

Recognition

Wang received the Model Overseas Chinese Young Entrepreneur Award, presented by the president of Taiwan, in 1998, the Best Manufacturer Award from the Pan Asian American Chamber of Commerce in 2005, and was the recipient of the Committee of 100 Philanthropy Award in 2007.

Wang personally received the Ellis Island Medal of Honor in 2006. His wife, Shirley Wang, received the award in 2011 on behalf of her work with the Walter and Shirley Wang Foundation.

The Wangs have been supporters of projects to address social and healthcare problems in China, including seed-stage and ongoing support for the China AIDS Initiative, an awareness and prevention program. Through this organization, they have funded public service announcements that have reached 500 million people to help stop the spread of AIDS and discourage cigarette smoking in China. Wang and his wife have been recognized by the China AIDS Initiative in 2006, the Museum of Chinese in America in New York in 2007, and the Los Angeles Chinatown Public Safety Association in 2008, as well as honored by Asian Americans Advancing Justice with its 2010 Public Service Award.

In August 2011, Mr. Wang was inducted into the DEA Education Foundation Board of Directors. The Foundation conducts fundraising, advocacy, educational outreach, exhibit sponsorship, and educational program development in support of the Drug Enforcement Administration Museum, which enlightens the public on the issues of illegal drugs and trafficking. On May 29, 2013, Mr. Wang received the Lifetime Achievement Award from the DEA for his advocacy in the prevention of drug use. The Wangs received both the China Institute's Blue Cloud Award and the Philanthropy Award from the Asia Society in 2016. The couple were honored by the Anti-Defamation League with their Humanitarian Award in 2018.

Personal life

Ten days after purchasing JM Eagle in 2005, Wang was diagnosed with stage-four nasal cancer. He was issued a clean bill of health in mid-2006.

During Wang's chemotherapy treatments in a Hong Kong hospital, JM Eagle, then known as J-M Manufacturing, faced a whistleblower lawsuit. In January 2006, an engineer accused JM Eagle of selling billions of dollars' worth of defective pipe to states and municipalities around the United States, and the company was sued under the federal False Claims Act. A Los Angeles jury found JM Eagle liable for failing to make 100 percent of its pipe, according to Underwriters Laboratories standards, though an Underwriters Laboratories engineer testified that the company never fell out of compliance during repeated audits. The whistleblower, John Hendrix, had been fired after a customer complained Hendrix had attempted bribery to favorably resolve a warranty claim.

Only two of the five municipalities suing in the first phase of the trial reported any defective pipe, and two others, the state of Nevada and Norfolk, Virginia, both admitted they continued to purchase JM products while aware of the allegations in the lawsuit. JM Eagle sued Phillips & Cohen for libel for post-verdict comments suggesting its products are dangerous and defective.

J-M Manufacturing was involved in a federal qui tam action brought on by various public entities, but while the lawsuit was pending law firm Sheppard Mullin Richter & Hampton went on to represent one of the public entities involved. Both clients had signed engagement agreements stating they had waived any such conflicts of interest, but the agreements did not disclose the specific conflicts, and Shepard did not advise either client of the conflicts. In August 2018, the California Supreme Court reversed a fee award that had been granted in favor of the law firm, maintaining that the firm's conflict of interest invalidated its entire agreement with J-M Manufacturing, including the arbitration clause, and thereby rendered its fee award a nullity.

References

Further reading

Year of birth missing (living people)
Living people
American chief executives
American philanthropists
American people of Chinese descent